Lieutenant General (Dr.) Edgar Ratcliffe Anderson Jr. (born March 13, 1940) was the 15th Surgeon General of the United States Air Force, Headquarters U.S. Air Force, Bolling Air Force Base, Washington D.C.

Biography
Born in Baton Rouge, Louisiana, Anderson entered the Air Force in March 1965 after receiving his medical degree from Louisiana State University, New Orleans. He is board certified in family practice, dermatology and aerospace medicine. He has commanded Air Force hospitals of all sizes and been a command surgeon. He is a command pilot, a former medical test pilot, chief flight surgeon and basic parachutist with 2,200 flying hours, principally in fighter aircraft. He retired from the Air Force on January 1, 1997.

Education
1964 Medical degree, Louisiana State University, New Orleans
1972 Industrial College of the Armed Forces
1980 Residency in dermatology, Wilford Hall Medical Center, Lackland Air Force Base, Texas
1982 Air War College

Assignments
March 1965 – July 1965, entered the Air Force through direct commission
July 1965 – September 1965, student, aerospace medicine, Brooks Air Force Base, Texas
September 1965 – September 1968, flight surgeon, 464th Tactical Airlift Wing, Pope Air Force Base, North Carolina
September 1968 – December 1969, chief of aerospace medicine, 33rd Tactical Fighter Wing, Eglin Air Force Base, Florida
December 1969 – March 1971, undergraduate and graduate pilot training, Williams Air Force Base, Arizona
March 1971 – September 1971, combat crew training, MacDill Air Force Base, Florida
September 1971 – July 1973, aircraft commander and assistant operations officer, 336th Tactical Fighter Squadron, Seymour Johnson Air Force Base, North Carolina
July 1973 – August 1975, chief of aeromedical services, USAF Regional Hospital, MacDill Air Force Base, Florida
August 1975 – October 1977, commander, USAF Hospital, Seymour Johnson Air Force Base, North Carolina
October 1977 – June 1980, resident in dermatology, Wilford Hall USAF Medical Center, Lackland Air Force Base, Texas
June 1980 – September 1981, staff dermatologist, Keesler USAF Medical Center, Keesler Air Force Base, Mississippi
September 1981 – April 1983, chief of flight test operations, Royal Air Force Institute of Aviation Medicine, U.S. Air Force-Royal Air Force exchange program, Royal Air Force Station Farnborough, England
April 1983 – February 1984, commander, USAF Regional Hospital, Langley Air Force Base, Virginia
February 1984 – October 1984, director of professional services, Office of the Command Surgeon, Tactical Air Command, Langley Air Force Base, Virginia
October 1984 – February 1986, command surgeon, Headquarters Pacific Air Forces, Hickam Air Force Base, Hawaii
February 1986 – May 1990, command surgeon, Strategic Air Command, Offutt Air Force Base, Nebraska
May 1990 – September 1994, commander, Wilford Hall Medical Center, Lackland Air Force Base, Texas
September 1994 – November 1996, surgeon general, Headquarters U.S. Air Force, Bolling Air Force Base, D.C.

Flight information
Rating: Command pilot, chief flight surgeon, parachutist
Flight hours: More than 2,200
Aircraft flown: F-4, F-15 Eagle and Hawker Hunter
Pilot wings from: Williams Air Force Base, Arizona (Class 71–04)

Major awards and decorations
  Air Force Distinguished Service Medal
  Legion of Merit with oak leaf cluster
  Distinguished Flying Cross with oak leaf cluster
  Meritorious Service Medal with two oak leaf clusters
  Air Medal with nine oak leaf clusters
  Air Force Commendation Medal

Other achievements
1969 Commander's Trophy, Flying Training Award, Officer Training Award, and Daedalian Orville Wright Award during undergraduate pilot training, Williams Air Force Base, Arizona
1971 "Top Gun," 336th Tactical Fighter Squadron, Seymour Johnson Air Force Base, North Carolina

Effective dates of promotion
First Lieutenant March 8, 1965
Captain June 5, 1965
Major June 5, 1969
Lieutenant Colonel June 15, 1973
Colonel June 5, 1978
Brigadier General May 1, 1986
Major General June 1, 1990
Lieutenant General September 26, 1994

References

Surgeons General of the United States Air Force
Recipients of the Air Force Distinguished Service Medal
Recipients of the Legion of Merit
Recipients of the Distinguished Flying Cross (United States)
Louisiana State University alumni
Recipients of the Air Medal
Living people
1940 births